

Administrative and municipal divisions

References

Chelyabinsk Oblast
Chelyabinsk Oblast